He's My Girl is a 1987 American comedy film directed  by  Gabrielle Beaumont  and starring David Hallyday and T. K. Carter.

Plot 

Bryan (David Hallyday) is a singer, and his best friend Reggie (T. K. Carter) is his manager. They both reside in Missouri. In order to help advance his music career, Reggie enters Bryan into a competition to win a trip to L.A. Bryan wins, but he has to bring a girl with him. In order to go, Reggie poses as a girl.

When the couple arrive in L.A., Bryan falls for Lisa (Jennifer Tilly), while Reggie falls for Tasha (Misha McK). They both find themselves pursuing their love while having to maintain their cover. Things hilariously go wrong, and they have to clear up the mess that ensues.

Cast 

 T. K. Carter as Reggie/Regina 
 David Hallyday as Bryan
 Misha McK as Tasha
 Warwick Sims as Simon Sledge
 Jennifer Tilly as Lisa
 Monica Parker as Sally
 Bibi Besch as Marcia
 David Clennon as Mason Morgan
 Robert Clotworthy as Jeffrey

Music 
The movie's theme song, "He's My Girl," sung by Hallyday, was released as a single in August 1987.  It reached #79 on the US Billboard Hot 100 and #72 on Cash Box.

Reception 

Rita Kempley of The Washington Post said, "The gender-bender "He's My Girl" is all cross-dressed up with nowhere to go. It's a farce so stale the only thing to do is make croutons."

Janet Maslin of The New York Times wrote "He's My Girl is at least made relatively painless by Mr. Carter, who is happily overconfident and even convincing in his role. Beyond that, the film has little to recommend it."

References

External links 

1987 comedy films
1987 films
American comedy films
Cross-dressing in American films
Films directed by Gabrielle Beaumont
American LGBT-related films
1980s English-language films
1980s American films